Tirukalukundram also known as Tirukazhukundram is a panchayat town and Taluk head of Tirukalukundram taluk in Chengalpattu district in the Indian state of Tamil Nadu.  It is famous for the Vedagiriswarar temple, a Hindu temple dedicated to Lord Shiva.

History
Tirukazhukundram's name is derived from kazhughu, meaning eagle. At one time, two eagles soared above this Shiva hilltop temple every day at lunch time, and the priest at the temple gave them food as a ritual. According to legend, these eagles were not ordinary eagles, but two rishis whom a curse had transformed into birds. The legend also said that the eagles would stop coming to the temple during the Kali Yuga. The eagles have not been sighted in recent years, which is regarded as a sign that the Kali Yuga has begun.

There is no Nandi on this hilltop temple of lord Shiva as it is believed that Nandi refused to step on this hill as it considered the whole of this hill as lord Shiva himself, hence stayed back on the ground level by the foothills.

The prefix Tiru in Tirukazukundram means 'holy' or 'sacred' and is traditionally used in names of temple towns in all parts of Tamil Nadu.

Demographics
In the 2011 India census, Tirukalukundram had a population of 29,391. Males constitute 50% of the population and females 50%. Tirukalukundram has an average literacy rate of 72%, lower than the national average of 74.04%: male literacy is 80%, and female literacy is 65%. In Tirukalukundram, 11% of the population is under 6 years of age.

There are about 565 steps to reach this hilltop temple.

The picture above is another ( big ) Shiva temple by name 'Shri Tirupura Sundari' on the ground level.

Location
Thirukazhukundram is located on State Highway 58 between Chennai and Thiruttani,  from the tourist town of Mahabalipuram.

Cultural references
In the Tamil science fiction thriller film 2.0 (2018), the story partially takes place in Thirukazhukundram.

References

Cities and towns in Chengalpattu district